Kaifan is an area in Kuwait City; it is located in the governorate of Al Asimah in Kuwait. is home to Kuwait SC. It is one of the prestigious areas in Kuwait and also known for holding the first cooperative society in Kuwait.

Embassies in Kaifan

 Embassies in Kuwait

References

Suburbs of Kuwait City
Populated places in Kuwait